Charlieville is an unincorporated community in Richland Parish, Louisiana, United States. The community is located   SE of Monroe, Louisiana.

History
Charlieville was a landing for steamboats in the 1800s on the banks of Boeuf River.

References

Unincorporated communities in Richland Parish, Louisiana
Unincorporated communities in Louisiana